Breznik Municipality (Bulgarian: Община Брезник) is a municipality in the Pernik Province of Bulgaria.

Demography 

At the 2011 census, the population of Radomir was 6,945. Most of the inhabitants were Bulgarians (92.30%) with a minority of Gypsies/Romani (2.72%), Turks (0.10%) and 6.94% of the population's ethnicity was unknown or unanswered.

Villages 
In addition to the capital town of Breznik, there are 34 villages in the municipality.

Municipalities in Pernik Province